The 1968 Paris–Roubaix was the 66th edition of the Paris–Roubaix cycle race and was held on 7 April 1968. The race started in Compiègne and finished in Roubaix. The race was won by Eddy Merckx of the Faema team.

Result

References

Paris–Roubaix
Paris-Roubaix
Paris-Roubaix
Paris-Roubaix
Paris-Roubaix